Hans Erich Apostel (22 January 1901 – 30 November 1972) was a German-born Austrian composer of classical music.

From 1916 to 1919 he studied piano, conducting and music theory in Karlsruhe with Alfred Lorenz. In 1920 he was Kapellmeister and Répétiteur at the Badisches Landestheater in Karlsruhe.  He studied in Vienna with Arnold Schoenberg from 1921 to 1925, and from 1925 to 1935 with Alban Berg, two prominent members of the Second Viennese School. At the same time, he taught piano, composition and music theory privately.

Some of his compositions demonstrate his particular affinity with expressionist painting—he was friends with Emil Nolde, Oskar Kokoschka and Alfred Kubin. During the Nazi period his music was proscribed as "degenerate", but he continued to live in Vienna until his death in 1972.

Apostel was active as a pianist, accompanist, and conductor of contemporary music in Austria, Germany, Switzerland and Italy.  After the war, he was prominent in the Austrian branch of the Gesellschaft für Neue Musik, of which he was president from 1947 to 1950.

He was an editor for the Universal Edition, and was responsible for new editions of the operas of Alban Berg, Wozzeck (published in 1955) and Lulu (published in 1963).

Although he won numerous prizes for his compositions (including the Grand Austrian State Prize in 1957), his works have rarely been performed.  He is buried in the Zentralfriedhof in Vienna, Group 32C, No. 57.

References

Further reading
Burton, Anthony. 2002. "Apostel, Hans Erich". The Oxford Companion to Music, edited by Alison Latham. Oxford and New York: Oxford University Press.
Gruber, Gerold W. 1989. "Hans Erich Apostel: Fischerhausserenade op. 45 (1971)". In Dodekaphonie in Österreich nach 1945, edited by Gottfried Scholz. Vienna: Verband der Wissenschaftlichen Gesellschaften Österreichs.
Gruber, Gerold W. 2001. "Apostel, Hans Erich". The New Grove Dictionary of Music and Musicians, second edition, edited by Stanley Sadie and John Tyrrell. London: Macmillan Publishers.
Kaufmann, Harald. 1965. Hans Erich Apostel: eEne Studie. Österreichische Komponisten des XX. Jahrhunderts 4. Vienna: Österreichischer Bundesverlag.

Austrian classical composers
Austrian male composers
German classical composers
German emigrants to Austria
Musicians from Karlsruhe
Pupils of Arnold Schoenberg
Pupils of Alban Berg
1901 births
1972 deaths
20th-century classical composers
German male classical composers
20th-century German composers
Twelve-tone and serial composers
20th-century German male musicians